The European Canoe Slalom Championships is an annual international canoeing and kayaking event organized by the European Canoe Association (ECA) since 1996. Until 2004 it was held every two years.

Summary

Medal table

As of the 2022 European Championships.

Men's canoe

C1
Debuted: 1996.

C1 team
Debuted: 1996.

C2
Debuted: 1996. Discontinued: 2018.

C2 team
Debuted: 1996. Discontinued: 2018.

Men's kayak

K1
Debuted: 1996.

K1 team
Debuted: 1996.

Extreme Canoe Slalom
Debuted: 2021

Women's canoe

C1
Debuted: 2010.

C1 team
Debuted: 2012.

Women's kayak

K1
Debuted: 1996.

K1 team
Debuted: 1996.

Extreme Canoe Slalom
Debuted: 2021

See also
 European Junior and U23 Canoe Slalom Championships
 ICF Canoe Slalom World Championships
 ICF World Junior and U23 Canoe Slalom Championships
 Canoe Slalom World Cup
 Canoeing and kayaking at the Summer Olympics
 Canoe slalom

References
European Championships results archive

External links
 European Canoe Association

 
Recurring sporting events established in 1996
Canoeing and kayaking competitions in Europe
European championships
Canoe slalom